Belebú Balachá is a community on Bioko island in Equatorial Guinea. It is south of Luba, the second-largest town on the island, and just north of the Luba Crater Scientific Reserve.
As of 2010 a new highway was under construction through the reserve from Belebu to Ureca but it cannot be confirmed if the highway was built.

References

Bioko
Populated places in Bioko Sur